Joe Powell (born February 25, 1994) is an American professional gridiron football strong safety for the Arlington Renegades of the XFL. He played college football at Globe Institute of Technology in Manhattan, New York City.

Early years
Powell prepped at I. C. Norcom High School in Portsmouth, Virginia, where he played football and track & field.

College career
Powell played one season of football at Globe Institute of Technology, totaling 53 tackles, 1.5 sacks and one interception in 2013.

Professional career

Lehigh Valley Steelhawks
Powell was signed by the Lehigh Valley Steelhawks of the Professional Indoor Football League (PIFL) in 2015. He earned PIFL Defensive Rookie of the Year honors after recording 52.5 tackles and 11 interceptions.

Cleveland Gladiators
Powell was assigned to the Cleveland Gladiators  of the Arena Football League on August 11, 2015. He played for the team during the 2016 season.

Powell attended rookie minicamp with the Philadelphia Eagles on a tryout basis in May 2016.

New York Giants
Powell signed with the New York Giants on August 17, 2016. On August 30, 2016, he was waived by the Giants.

Buffalo Bills
On October 25, 2016, Powell was signed to the Bills' practice squad. He signed a reserve/future contract with the Bills on January 2, 2017. On September 2, 2017, Powell was waived by the Bills.

Atlanta Havoc
Powell signed with the Atlanta Havoc in January 2018.

First stint with Brigade
On March 22, 2018, Powell was assigned to the Baltimore Brigade.

Birmingham Iron
Powell signed with the Birmingham Iron of the Alliance of American Football (AAF) for the 2019 season.

Second stint with Brigade
After the AAF suspended football operations, Powell was assigned to the Baltimore Brigade on April 7, 2019.

St. Louis BattleHawks
In October 2019, Powell was drafted by the St. Louis BattleHawks of the XFL in the 2020 XFL Draft. He scored the first special teams touchdown in the second generation of the XFL on February 23, 2020, scoring on a 90-yard kickoff return, which featured a reverse that he received from Keith Mumphery. He had his contract terminated when the league suspended operations on April 10, 2020.

Hamilton Tiger-Cats
On April 13, 2020, Powell signed with the Hamilton Tiger-Cats. He was released on April 22, 2021.

Arlington Renegades
Powell was selected by the Arlington Renegades in the 2023 XFL Draft.

References

External links
Globe Tech bio 
Arena Football bio

1994 births
Living people
Sportspeople from Portsmouth, Virginia
Players of American football from Virginia
American football defensive backs
Globe Tech Knights football players
Lehigh Valley Steelhawks players
Cleveland Gladiators players
New York Giants players
Buffalo Bills players
Atlanta Havoc players
Baltimore Brigade players
American Arena League players
Birmingham Iron players
St. Louis BattleHawks players
Hamilton Tiger-Cats players
Arlington Renegades players